Brillantmont International School is a coeducational international school.

Established in 1882, is one of the oldest boarding schools in Switzerland, being owned by the same family for five generations. It is located in the centre of Lausanne, a five-minute walk from the amenities of the city. The school grounds have a view over Lake Léman and the Swiss Alps.

At the present day, Brillantmont has around 150 students, boarding and day, aged 13–18, from over 35 different nationalities.

Accreditation

Swiss authorities

BIS's (upper) secondary education (Middle and High School) is not approved as a Mittelschule/Collège/Liceo by the Swiss Federal State Secretariat for Education, Research and Innovation (SERI).

International

Brillantmont International School is a member of the Swiss Federation of Private Schools and is fully accredited by the New England Association of Schools and Colleges (NEASC) and the Council of International Schools (CIS). It is a member of Swiss Learning.

Academics
Brillantmont's academic programmes are taught in English. Students study in the British Programme, to prepare for the IGCSE and A Level examinations (Cambridge Assessment International Education); or for the American Programme, which prepares students for the American High School Graduation Diploma.

The 8th and 9th Grade programmes of studies are designed to meet the needs of international 13 to 15 year olds and covers a broad range of subjects. After 9th Grade personalised timetables enable them to develop their strengths and interests, keeping in view their future university choices / career plans. Students in the 10th Grade follow a selection of courses which cover a solid range of subjects. In 11th and 12th Grade the courses extend and build on students’ subject knowledge. They can focus on subjects in which they are particularly interested and which they may wish to pursue further at university.

Throughout the high school, students have the opportunity to prepare for external, internationally recognized examinations : IGCSE / AS / A Level examinations (Cambridge Assessment International Education); PSAT, SAT, SAT Subject Tests, AP Examinations (US College Board); European Language Examinations.

Upon completion of their studies students enter universities all over the world, with many choosing to go to the UK or to the USA. Brillantmont boasts that 100% of its students continue their studies to higher education.

Brillantmont also offers a post high school 13th Grade programme for students who have already completed their high school studies.

At Brillantmont, class sizes are small, averaging 15. All teaching is in English but every student must learn French, the local language.

There is a strong emphasis on technology across campus and the interactive private area on the website allows parents to follow their child's progress.Also, in this school, artistic skills are also enhanced with singing and acting classes, as well as drawing, sculpture, photography, digital design, journalism and learning of various musical instruments.

School life
Each weekend excursions are organized to enable students to discover Switzerland and its neighbouring countries. From January to April, skiing is a major fixture of the excursion calendar. After class, extra-curricular activities take place on campus. These activities include Model United Nations, Finance Society, Yoga, School Band, Vocal Group, Cooking Club, or Photography.

Throughout the year, students have the opportunity to travel to other countries in Europe and even as far as Nepal to take part in charity work. This social labor mostly consists in students fundraising for Globalharmony or participating in a building project run by Habitat for Humanity.

Boarders live on campus, in houses according to their age and gender. Resident teachers look after the students. The school has a house system, which facilitates contact and friendship within the school community. The heads of the school live on campus. An on-campus health service is available 24 hours a day. 

College and career guidance is offered to all students and counseling is available to assist students with academic and personal problems.

Day students constitute a third of the student body and come from across the Leman region. A school bus service collects them in the morning and they can stay at school for lunch.

Faculty
The school faculty has 30 professional staff representing 10 nationalities. There is a faculty / student ratio of 1 to 4 with an average class size of 15.

Summer course
A summer course takes place in July and August to welcome boys and girls aged 10–17 to study French or English with sports and activities. The minimum stay is two weeks.

References

External links 

 

Educational institutions established in 1882
Boarding schools in Switzerland
International schools in Switzerland
Schools in Lausanne
1882 establishments in Switzerland